Bishopston may refer to:

Places
England
 Bishopston, Bristol, a suburb and ward of the city of Bristol

Wales
 Bishopston, Swansea, a village
 Bishopston (Swansea ward), an electoral ward and community
Bishopston, also known as Bishton, a village in the City of Newport

People
Edward Bishop, Baron Bishopston (1920–84), British politician

See also
 Bishopton (disambiguation)
 Bishopstone (disambiguation)